Evelyn Keppel  [Dorward] (June 12, 1929 – November 19, 2006) played in the All-American Girls Professional Baseball League in 1947.  She was a catcher who both batted and threw right-handed.

Personal life
Keppel was born in Fullerton, Pennsylvania to Evelyn (née Beck) and Luis Keppel Sr.  She married Carl Pete W. Dorward, who died in 2004.  Apart from her love for baseball, she was a homemaker with an interest in religion.  In her later years, Keppel was a member of the Sacred Heart of Jesus Catholic Church, in Allentown.

Baseball career
Although Keppel only played baseball professionally for one year, 1947, she did so for two teams. She began as a catcher for the Kenosha Comets, but was later traded to the South Bend Blue Sox.

Batting

Sources

All-American Girls Professional Baseball League players
Kenosha Comets players
South Bend Blue Sox players
Baseball players from Pennsylvania
1929 births
2006 deaths
20th-century American women
20th-century American people
21st-century American women